An exótico is a lucha libre style professional wrestler who performs in drag. Most exóticos are Mexican but some foreign wrestlers have also adopted the practise.

Performers

See also
List of drag queens
List of drag kings

References

Further reading
 The World of Lucha Libre

Drag (clothing)-related lists
exoticos
Exóticos